The Holiday Inns Champion of Champions was a golf tournament on the South African Tour. It was played just once, in late December 1976, at Kensington Golf Club in Johannesburg, South Africa. The winner was John Bland, who defeated Hugh Baiocchi and Graham Henning in a two-hole aggregate playoff.

Winners

See also
Trustbank Tournament of Champions

References

External links
Sunshine Tour's official site

Former Sunshine Tour events
Golf tournaments in South Africa